The 2015 Big 12 Conference baseball tournament was held from May 20 through 24 at ONEOK Field in Tulsa, Oklahoma. The annual tournament determines the conference champion of the Division I Big 12 Conference for college baseball. The winner of the tournament will earn the league's automatic bid to the 2015 NCAA Division I baseball tournament.

The tournament has been held since 1997, the inaugural year of the Big 12 Conference. Among current league members, Texas has won the most championships with five, winning again in 2015. Among original members, Baylor and Kansas State have never won the event. Iowa State discontinued their program after the 2001 season without having won a title. Having joined in 2013, TCU won their first title in 2014 while West Virginia has yet to win the Tournament.

Format and seeding
The top eight finishers from the regular season will be seeded one through eight, and will then play a two-bracket double-elimination tournament leading to a winner-take-all championship game.

Results

All-Tournament Team
Source:

References

Tournament
Big 12 Conference Baseball Tournament
Big 12 Conference baseball tournament
Big 12 Conference baseball tournament
College sports in Oklahoma
History of Tulsa, Oklahoma
Sports in Tulsa, Oklahoma
Baseball competitions in Oklahoma
Tourist attractions in Tulsa, Oklahoma